Municipality of Navolato is a municipality in Sinaloa in northwestern Mexico.

References

Municipalities of Sinaloa